Happy Go Round was a 1970s Australian nationwide children's television series created by QTQ-9 Brisbane, Queensland, starring Darlene Joyce Steinhardt (now Darlene Zschech), Darren Ormsby, Jenny Andrews, Leigh Muirhead, Terry Stewart, David Napier, Cindy Byron (now Cinderella Potts Abrams), Donna Stanley and Joanne Stanley. It aired between 1976 and 1978.

It was hosted by Jacki McDonald in the years before she joined the cast of Hey Hey It's Saturday, and was the first Australian children's show to receive the "C" rating for high quality children's programming.

References

Bio of Happy Go 'Round guest Mark Kristian
Article about Darlene zschech which mentions the show
Cindy Byron, (Cinderella Potts Abrams), daughter of Australian entertainer, April Byron and mother of Emmalee Rainbow Abrams star of Man Vs. Child Chef Showdown.

Nine Network original programming
1976 Australian television series debuts
Australian children's television series
1978 Australian television series endings